Frank James Wurm (April 27, 1924 – September 19, 1993) was a professional baseball pitcher. He appeared in one game in Major League Baseball for the Brooklyn Dodgers during the 1944 season. He started the game, giving up four runs while only getting one out, a strikeout.

Born in Cambridge, New York, Wurm died in Glens Falls, New York.

References

External links

Major League Baseball pitchers
Brooklyn Dodgers players
Olean Oilers players
Newport News Dodgers players
Montreal Royals players
Baseball players from New York (state)
1924 births
1993 deaths
People from Cambridge, New York
Sportspeople from Glens Falls, New York
Burials in Warren County, New York